Bahori ( Bahori, also Баҳор Bahor) is a village in the Nosiri Khusrav District of the Khatlon Region of Tajikistan. Bahori is the seat of Nosiri Khusrav District, and of the jamoat Firuza.

References

Populated places in Khatlon Region